Gordon Clydesdale (born 28 May 1938) was a Scottish footballer who played for St Mirren and Dumbarton.

In 1960, he played abroad in Canada's National Soccer League with Olympia.

References

1938 births
Scottish footballers
St Mirren F.C. players
Dumbarton F.C. players
Scottish Football League players
Living people
Association football inside forwards
Canadian National Soccer League players